Egidijus Žilinskas (born 13 March 1986) is a Lithuanian judoka.

Achievements

Two silver medals in European championship u23 and one gold medal in European championship u21.

References

External links
 

1986 births
Living people
Lithuanian male judoka
Place of birth missing (living people)
Universiade medalists in judo
Universiade bronze medalists for Lithuania
Medalists at the 2007 Summer Universiade